The following American politicians switched parties while they were holding elected office.

Federal

State

Local

See also 
 List of Canadian politicians who have crossed the floor
 List of elected British politicians who have changed party affiliation
 List of party switchers in the United States
 List of United States representatives who switched parties
 List of United States senators who switched parties
 Party switching in the United States
 Waka-jumping

References 

Switched parties
Switched
United States, list
American politicians who switched parties